This is an incomplete list of Armenian wrestlers, from 1952 to the present.

Ara Abrahamian
Artiom Kiouregkian
Mkkhitar Manukyan
Armen Mkrchyan
Armen Nazaryan
Seth Rollins

See also

References

Wrestlers
Armenian